Berkhamsted School is an independent day school in Berkhamsted, Hertfordshire, England. The present school was formed in 1997 by the amalgamation of the original Berkhamsted School, founded in 1541 by John Incent, Dean of St Paul's Cathedral, Berkhamsted School for Girls, established in 1888, and Berkhamsted Preparatory School. The new merged school was initially called Berkhamsted Collegiate School, but reverted to Berkhamsted School in 2008. In 2011 Berkhamsted School merged with Heatherton House School, a girls' preparatory school in Amersham, to form the Berkhamsted Schools Group. The Group acquired Haresfoot School in Berkhamsted and its on site day nursery in 2012, which became Berkhamsted Pre-Preparatory School for children aged three to seven, and Berkhamsted Day Nursery.

Berkhamsted School is a "diamond school" in which pupils are taught coeducationally in the Pre-Prep School, Prep School and Sixth Form, but independently in the traditional Senior years, between the ages of 11 and 16.  The school has four main sites: the Pre-Prep School, the Prep School, the Castle Street Campus and Kings Road Campus (the latter two being the original boys' and girls' schools respectively).

The school is noted for its distinctive collegiate and pastoral structure, a varied sporting, outdoor education and cultural co-curricular programme and participation in the life of the local community. Richard Backhouse, previously principal of Monkton Combe School, became principal of the school in January 2016.

House system
All Berkhamsted pupils belong to a house throughout their time at the School. Each house is run by a house-master supported by several house tutors. Together they are responsible for providing pastoral support for their pupils and serve as the primary link between parents and the school. Houses are both physical environments and communities, each forming a distinct entity within the larger organisation of the school itself. Pupils attend their house for morning and afternoon registration, to play games throughout the day, and for the majority of the administration which governs their time at the school. They also participate in school events on behalf of their house.

Senior boys' houses

Adders was formed in 1915 to accommodate the so-called "train boys" who, by nature of their daily commute to school, were often excluded from school activities. Various explanations have been given for the name 'Adders'. It may be a casual abbreviation of "the add-on house", or a contraction of 'Adlebert House', now the chaplain's residence. However, according to an anecdote current in the 1960s, the boys were asked for suggestions and one proposed the present name ("Bees" and "Swifts" already existed). On being asked why, he explained, "Puff adders, sir!", an allusion to the steam trains on which the pupils travelled. Adders is situated in a separate building next to Newcroft and it takes the ground floor while Fry's house uses the top floor. Current head of house is Richard Margerison.
Bartrum the newest house, founded in 2019. Current head of house is Andrew Wilkes.
Bees, dating back to 1897 and situated on Mill Street next to Swifts. Current head of house is Graeme Reid-Davies.
Cox's, opened in 1958 in response to the growing numbers of day boys. Named after Cuthbert Cox. Until September 2010, the house occupied a separate building located next to the Tesco carpark. Cox's moved from its present location to the site of the old swimming pool, sharing with Tilmans. The former Cox's house was renovated into a new drama studio. Current head of house is Jessica Thackaray.
Fry's is named after one of Berkhamsted's former headmasters, Thomas Charles Fry. It is located above Adders. Current head of house is Andrew Harker.
Greenes, found along the cloisters of the Grass Quad. The School's association with the Greene family is recognised in its name. Current head of house is Max Stallard.
Loxwood, also found along the cloisters. This house was named after a former girls' school house. Current head of house is Martin Middleton.
Swifts, established at the same time as Bees. Current head of house is Douglas Foster.
Tilman (formerly Incents), until September 2010, was both a boarding and day boy house. The boarding accommodation is situated along Chesham Road, and is the birthplace of Graham Greene. The house was named after John Incent, the school's founder, and had its main entrance in the cloisters between Loxwood and Greenes. In September 2010, Incents day house closed and was renamed 'Tilman' and moved to a new location on the site of the old swimming pool, sharing the site with Cox's. The former Incents House was renovated into a study for the headmaster and deputy head of Berkhamsted Boys. The boarding house remained unchanged. Current head of house is George Campbell.

That at least three of the eight Senior Boys' Houses appear to be named after various fauna was not always intentional. When Swifts and Bees were formed in 1897, they were to be called 'A' and 'B' respectively, but the former's first house master considered this dull, naming his House 'Swifts'. 'Bees' is thus phonetic. 'Adders' may be wholly fortuitous; 'Reeves' and 'Hawks', now sixth form houses, add to the confusion. Richard Reeve was the school's first headmaster; Hawks was named by the apparent "fauna tradition" in 1933.

Senior girls' houses
Holme
New Stede 
Old Stede 
Russell 
St David's 
Stephenson, founded in 2017, named in honour of microbiologist and biochemist Marjory Stephenson.
Wolstenholme, founded in 2011, named after Sue Wolstenholme who was a school governor for 35 years.

Sixth form houses
Ashby, named after the mother of John Incent's second wife, Katherine. 
Burgh, pronounced . 
Churchill, after Clementine Churchill, Baroness Spencer-Churchill and formerly girls' boarding accommodation.
Hawks, a former junior boys' house, established in 1934. 
Nash, named after Henry Nash, a founder of Berkhamsted School for Girls.
Reeves, named after Richard Reeve and founded as a junior boys' house, along with Hawks.
St George's, originally a junior house for the "train boys", rather like Adders.
School, variously the headmaster's quarters and a boarding house.
Spencer, a new sixth form house introduced in 2009.
Tudor, a new sixth form house introduced in 2019.

History of Berkhamsted School, 1541–1996

Founding

High clergy of the 16th century frequently distinguished themselves by their furthering of the educational establishment and, in this respect, Berkhamsted owes much to John Incent. In 1523, he called upon the brothers of the local brotherhood of St John the Baptist to divert the funds they had hitherto donated to the monastic hospital (which had closed) to the Brotherhood House, about which little is known. In 1541, however, Incent applied to the King, Henry VIII, in pursuit of a licence "to purchase £40 in land by the year," and was successful. Although Incent was Berkhamsted's most famous descendant, it is considered an act of great piety that he chose to found a school outside what had become his sphere of influence.

By 1544, Berkhamsted School's first building, now known as 'Old Hall' was complete, later to be described by William Camden as "the only structure in Berkhamsted worth a second glance." The formal opening is recorded in the Ancient Documents:
When the building of the said Schoole was thus finished, the Deane sent for the chiefe men of the Towne into the Schoole, where he kneeling downe, gave thanks to Almighty God, which had given him life to see the perfection of that work, which both he, the towne and the country had beene about for the space of 20 years as is manifest by the pmisses.  First he read his licence.  Then he called for Richd Reeve, and placed him in the seate there made for the Schoolemr.  and so did ordaine, make and pnounce him to be the first Master of the said Schoole and after that tooke him by the hand and did give him and his successors for ever possession of the lodgings appteining to that office.  In like manner he placed John Audley to be Usher , and John East to be Chaplen.  This done he did give possession by his deed bearing date the 23 of March in the 36 yeare of Henry the 8 to the said Richd Reeve John Audley and John East and their successours for ever, of all the land to the sd Schoole then appointed, which are expressed pticularly in an act of pliamt.  made 2 & 3 Ed 6.  Finally the Deane began TE DEUM LAUDAMUS which being finished with certaine other praiers and ceremonies, the whole Companie did there drink together and so depted.

Yet the legal foundation was not nearly so sound. When Incent died some 18 months later, his entire wealth (over £330) became the king's, his documents stating that Berkhamsted's founder, a highly educated lawyer, had died intestate. The authenticity of this claim is rightly questioned: shortly after Incent's death, a complaint was made to the king "by some evill persons that the Deane had laid to the Schoole more revenues than his licence [£40 annually] did permitt him." Furthermore, Henry VIII stood to gain £196 and "a front of pearls" from the Dean's estate. However, there had been no formal incorporation of the school, and records suggest that Incent had spent much time since the opening preparing, but not realising, legal protection. An investigation into the claims that his annual endowment had been exceeded was commissioned and undertaken by John Waterhouse, a favourite not only of the king, but also a confidant of Incent, who had been present at the opening. His choice of commissioner suggests the foundation still had royal approval, something that had allowed the school to survive the first attack against it. The most enduring legacy of the foundation nonetheless remains the building itself.

A Delicate establishment

Incent's death, which itself had created a threat to the school, was followed by that of Henry VIII in January 1547. The Chantries Act 1546, which could have jeopardised the post of chaplain at Berkhamsted, was replaced by new legislation, and the foundation was declared "unperfect". A Foundation Act was introduced in parliament to settle the various claims to the Incent estate, but only those concerning the most immediate relatives of John. Thus claims to land of the school's endowment in Sparkford near Winchester were made and tried, resulting in significant loss to the school.

An additional threat came when Edward VI, acting on advice, re-established the school under his own name. In reality, there was both initial benefit and ultimate disadvantage in this. Richard Reeve, the first headmaster, held strict Protestant views, and was dismissed by the Bishop of Lincoln, acting upon Queen Mary's instructions, in 1555. He was replaced by William Barker, who offered an alternative religious policy, for he himself was removed when Elizabeth gained the throne.

Fulfillment under Saltmarsh and Hunt

William Saltmarsh enjoyed a longer headmastership than either Reeve or Barker. The latter had appointed Leonard Stepney as usher, but he lost his post in 1571 on charges of harbouring a Catholic priest. His successor, John Bristowe, had a still more colourful end, murdered gruesomely in 1597 by a local yeoman. Although this would have caused Saltmarsh concern, this was otherwise a very successful period in the history of Berkhamsted School. Pupil numbers continued to increase, and a handful of Berkhamstedians, as they would become known, achieved notoriety.

By 1616, some years after Saltmarsh's death, it was written

Scholae Ludimagister cum 33 annos eidem praefuisset amplam pecuniam testamento suo moriens legavit reficiendis his aedibus

which Williams translates: "William Saltmarsh, third Headmaster of this School, after presiding over it for 33 years, on his deathbed bequeathed a sum of money sufficient for the repair of this building."

It is uncertain why the building (by which it is meant Old Hall) had fallen into disrepair under an otherwise successful headmaster, but through his donation Saltmarsh had decisively added himself to Berkhamsted's list of benefactors.

All available evidence, of which there is little, suggests that the Hunt years were also successful ones for the school. His period in the office probably witnessed greater stability in the school than in his personal life – he was married four times – and there was praise for his leadership, a former pupil recording "much reverence and affect" for Hunt. It also appears that he took as active a part in the life of Berkhamsted as had become and remains a tradition, serving as overseer for the poor and bailiff as well as contributing to church funds. He died in office, aged 70, in 1636.

Shorter tenures

There were two hereditary headmasterships in the history of Berkhamsted School, neither of which was successful. The first was that of Henry Hunt, a graduate of Trinity College, Oxford, who died within six months of succeeding his father; the second was to come in the 19th century.  In England, however, the political environment began to take its toll on Berkhamsted.

Berkhamsted, situated along a route between London and the battlefields of the English Civil War, became the subject of parliamentary action to preserve the town. Pitkin's death is recorded in the parish register of Fleet Street, London in September 1643; in his history, Williams suggests Pitkin may have visited London in an attempt to obtain protection for the school, instead dying of the plague. He was succeeded by Timothy Taylor, until then usher, but the conditions of the period deny history any formal details, except that his death in 1648 was probably also a result of plague. Ogle (1648–1651/2) witnessed local controversy resulting from the Civil War and it was likely that the school's seemingly relentless decline had begun in earnest by the time of his tenure, with student numbers falling from 80 to under 10 over three decades.

It is uncertain whether Peter Berkenhead ever even served as headmaster, although the weight of evidence suggests that he did (however insignificantly). This series of less distinguished office-holders is attributable in part to the Civil War; further, since the value of money had for so long been falling, the annual pay, having been set at the foundation, was insufficient for such a post by the end of the 17th century.

The Fossan saga

Thomas Fossan, a friend of Samuel Pepys, petitioned Charles II for the Berkhamsted job in December 1662. His motive in doing so is unclear, himself recognising that "by reason of its small salary" it was not highly sought, but mostly since, having realised his ambition, Fossan so neglected his duties. Indeed, such was the strength of feeling judges against Fossan that the very same people who had recommended him in 1662 wrote to the authorities six years later in the name of "the trust imposed in [them] by the founders of the schoole" that the headmaster be removed. When the charges were put to him (that both he and his usher had spent much time away from the school, that the boys' knowledge of grammar was minimal and that the townspeople had taken to lodging the scholars in light of the school's failure so to do), Fossan replied that "he cared not whether he had any scholars or not, for the fewer he had the less trouble he should have."  His forced resignation followed shortly after.

'So Mean a School'
It is some indication of the extent of Berkhamsted's degeneration under Fossan that his successor, Edmund Newboult, was recommended by the Bishop of Hereford as "of parts sufficient for so mean a school," an endorsement described as "comically unenthusiastic". The most prominent historical source on Newboult remains a reply he made to an educational researcher some years into his tenure, noting that "The Statues of the Schoole were made in the time of popery, therefore not observed." During his 17 years of office, Newboult does appear to have provided a solid educational environment at Berkhamsted, at least relatively speaking, something continued under his successor, Thomas Wren. In his wake came John Theed, member of a prosperous Buckinghamshire family, and Berkhamsted's longest serving headmaster. Indeed, throughout the 18th century, there were to be only four occupants of the post, an age not only of stability but stagnation. Nonetheless, the three inspections carried out during the three years found no cause for concern, and in their record is revealed the first reference to curriculum content, the boys having been examined on Ovid's Metamorphoses.

Theed was the school's second pluralist (it is no inspiration that the first was Fossan): his obituary in The Gentleman's Magazine recorded him as vicar of Marsworth and made no mention of his Berkhamsted role – some suggest this is characteristic of an insouciant, unambitious approach to the school. A similar charge could not be made against Evan Price. Having served as usher for 16 of Theed's less proactive years, Price had become accustomed to the day-to-day running of the school. On Theed's death in 1734, his succession, still the jurisdiction of the sovereign, brought Price to the headmastership, despite his not having attended university and his flamboyant record – as curate of Bovingdon, he had been involved in an "unseemly brawl" during a burial he was officiating.

Notable alumni

Henry Atkins (1554/5–1635), president of the College of Physicians, 1606–1635
Richard Field (1561–1616), clergyman and theologian
Sir Algernon Methuen (1856–1924), founder and owner, Methuen & Co, publishers, 1889–1924
Clementine Churchill, Baroness Spencer-Churchill (1885–1977), wife of Winston Churchill
Charles Seltman (1886–1957), author and archeologist
Sir Lumley Lyster (1888–1957), admiral, Royal Navy 
Clifford Allen, 1st Baron Allen of Hurtwood (1889–1939), politician and peace campaigner
Sir Donald Fergusson (1891–1963), Permanent Secretary, Ministry of Agriculture and Fisheries, 1936–1945, and Ministry of Fuel and Power, 1945–1952
Clement Glenister (1897–1968), cricketer and Royal Navy officer
H. W. Tilman (1898–1977), mountaineer and sailor
A. K. Chesterton (1899–1973), first chairman of the National Front, 1967–1971
C. H. S. Fifoot, (1899–1975), legal scholar
F. S. Smythe (1900–1949), mountaineer and author
Raymond Greene (1901–1982), endocrinologist and mountaineer
Rex Tremlett (1903–1986) author and prospector
Claud Cockburn (1904–1981), writer and journalist
Graham Greene (1904–1991), author
Bill Fiske, Baron Fiske (1905–1975), first leader of the Greater London Council, 1964–1967, and chairman of the Decimal Currency Board
Sir Peter Quennell (1905–1993), writer and editor
Sir Colin Buchanan (1907–2001), town planner
Sir Hugh Greene (1910–1987), director-general of the BBC, 1960–1969
Michael Sherard (1910–1998), born Malcolm Sherrard, fashion designer and academic 
Sir Kenneth Cork (1913–1991), accountant, and Lord Mayor of the City of London, 1978–1979
Margot Jefferys (1916–1999), professor of medical sociology, Bedford College, London, 1968–1982
Antony Hopkins (1921–2014), composer
Robert Simons (1922–2011), cricketer
Stephen Dodgson (1924–2013), composer and broadcaster
Mark Boxer (Marc) (1931–1988), cartoonist and magazine editor
Michael Podro (1931–2008), art historian
Alexander Goehr (born 1932), composer and 1987 Reith Lecturer
Sir Anthony Cleaver (born 1938), chairman of the Medical Research Council, 1998–2006
Sir Robin Knox-Johnston (born 1939), yachtsman
John Bly (born 1939), antiques expert
Michael Meacher (1939–2015), politician
Richard Mabey (born 1941), nature writer
John Graham Nicholls (born 1929), physiologist
Kit Wright (born 1944), children's poet
Keith Mans (born 1946), politician
Zaha Hadid (1950–2016), multiple-award-winning architect
Alan Goldberg (born 1954), warden of western marble arch synagogue
Lieutenant General Mark Mans (born 1955), Adjutant-General to the Forces
Guy Pooley (born 1965), rower
Emma Fielding (born 1966), actress
Roger Moorhouse (born 1968), historian and author
Stephen Campbell Moore (born 1977 Stephen Thorpe), actor
Robert Courts (born 1978), politician and Member of Parliament for Witney
Carla Chases (born 1984), actress
James Rodwell (born 1984), rugby, team GB rugby 7s at the Rio Olympic Games, 2016 - silver medalist 
Talulah Riley (born 1985), actress
Will Fraser (born 1989), rugby union player
Roman Kemp (born 1993), radio and television presenter
Olajide "JJ" Olatunji (born 1993), YouTuber, rapper and boxer better known as KSI
Jonathan Bond (born 1993), football goalkeeper

Victoria Cross holders 
Three former students have won the Victoria Cross: Arthur Mayo during the Indian Mutiny; and George Pearkes and Brett Mackay Cloutman, both during the First World War.

School offices

Headmasters of Berkhamsted School, 1544–1996
Between the school's opening in 1544 and the formation of the collegiate school in 1997, there were 30 headmasters, whose average length of service was 15 years.

Principals of Berkhamsted Collegiate School
 Priscilla Chadwick (1997–2008)

Principals of Berkhamsted School
 Mark Steed (2008–2015)
 Richard Backhouse (2016–present)

Notes

References

Further reading

Berkhamsted School Remembrance. Information about Berkhamsted School during World War I.
The Old Berkhamstedians. The old boys' and girls' organisation of Berkhamsted School.
The Graham Greene Birthplace Trust Organise the annual Graham Greene Festival in October at the school.

External links

1541 establishments in England
Educational institutions established in the 1540s
Private schools in Hertfordshire
Member schools of the Headmasters' and Headmistresses' Conference
Member schools of the Girls' Schools Association
Diamond schools
School